Unroyal, is a 2020 Nigerian drama film directed by Moses Inwang and produced by Matilda Lambert. The film stars Matilda Lambert and IK Ogbonna in the lead roles whereas Prince Sontoye, Blossom Chukwujekwu and Linda Osifo made supportive roles. It is the story of Princess Boma, daughter of Okrika Kings, where she treats everyone as though they weren’t humans.

The film made its premier on 20 March 2020 and later released through Netflix on 15 August 2021. The film received mixed reviews from critics.

Cast
 Matilda Lambert as Princess Boma
 Pete Edochie
 Shafy Bello
 IK Ogbonna
 Prince Sontoye
 Blossom Chukwujekwu
 Linda Osifo
 Emem Inwang
 Ime Bishop Umoh as Kala
 Chinenye Nnebe
 Femi Adebayo
Kingsley Abasili

Awards and nominations

References 

2020 films
English-language Nigerian films
2020 drama films
Nigerian drama films
2020s English-language films